Howtown Hotel is a hotel in Howtown, Cumbria, England, located near the southern shore of the Ullswater lake. Although it won the César Award for Best Hotel in 1991 by The Good Hotel Guide, Lonely Planet describes the hotel as "bewitchingly backwards" with early 20th century decor. As of 2001, the hotel contained 10 double rooms, 2 single rooms and 4 self-catering cottages. It has been run by four generations of the Baldry family since it opened in 1903.

References

External links
Official site

Hotels in Cumbria
Hotels established in 1903
Houses completed in 1903
1903 establishments in England
Martindale, Cumbria